Kyle Ryde (Kyle Brandon Ryde, born 22 July 1997) is an English motorcycle solo road racer. For 2022 he is riding in BSB with OMG Racing, switching to Yamaha machinery as used in 2021 by the McAMS team.

During 2021 he was contracted to OMG BMW in the British Superbike Championship (BSB), with a commitment to continue with the same team for 2022 using Yamaha R1 machines. For 2020 he rode for Hawk Racing under the Buildbase Suzuki brand.

In 2019, Ryde competed in a full season of British GP2 racing for Ryan Saxelby Racing (RS Racing) run as a separate class within the British Supersport Championship events, winning the championship.

Career
Ryde spent his early years until 2002 in Swanwick, Derbyshire, then moved to nearby Jacksdale, Nottinghamshire where he is still based.

He contested the Red Bull MotoGP Rookies Cup in 2011 and 2012. He became the youngest ever British 125cc Champion by winning the 2011 British 125 Championship. He secured his second British Championship by winning the British National Superstock 600 Championship in 2014.

For 2015, Ryde stepped up to compete in the British Supersport Championship riding for Pacedayz European Trackdays aboard a Yamaha YZF-R6, finishing the season in second place. On 24 May 2015 he participated for the first time in a Supersport World Championship event, as a wild-card rider in the Great Britain round at Donington Park. He classified third after having qualified on the front row in second place.

In early 2016 Ryde signed with an Italian team for his first season's racing in the Supersport World Championship on a Yamaha YZF-R6, but the team unexpectedly withdrew from competition without explanation after the first five events in May 2016. Ryde only missed one event, at Sepang, Malaysia. He later rode an MV Agusta F3 675 and a Kawasaki ZX-6R in the Supersport World Championship for Schmidt Racing, a team formed during late 2015 in Hungary, joining with teammate Nicolás Terol.

For the 2017 season, he rode a Kawasaki ZX-6R in the Supersport World Championship as teammate to reigning Supersport World Champion Kenan Sofuoğlu, but parted company in early October before the season-end due to poor race performances.

He made his debut ride in British Superbikes for the last three races of the season in October 2017 at Brands Hatch on Billy McConnell's machine, who was injured at the Thruxton round in August and was unable to compete in any further races. Ryde finished in 15th, 17th and 18th.

After signing to ride for his old team boss Craig Fitzpatrick at CF Motorsports in the British Superbike Championship aboard a Yamaha YZF-R1 during 2018, Ryde announced in late June via social media that he was withdrawing from National circuit racing, with no immediate plans.

He soon returned on 21/22 July at Brands Hatch, riding a Kalex in the British GP2 category within the British Supersport National Championship, placing 5th in the first leg and then winning in both his category and the Supersport race overall in the main event.

For 2020 rode in the British Superbike Championship (BSB) for Stuart and Steve Hicken's Hawk Racing team under the Buildbase Suzuki brand, after a try-out at the final two rounds of the 2019 season. Ryde made strong start to the 2020 season and achieved his first two BSB race wins at the Silverstone round.

In 2021 he switched to Rich Energy OMG Racing BMW to ride the new BMW M1000RR alongside Bradley Ray, finishing the season 15th overall with 118 points. After the final round at Brands Hatch it was announced Rich Energy OMG Racing would switch to Yamaha R1 bikes for the 2022 season with Ryde and Ray continuing as the team's riders.

Career statistics

Grand Prix motorcycle racing

Races by year
(key) (Races in bold indicate pole position; races in italics indicate fastest lap)

Supersport World Championship

Races by year
(key) (Races in bold indicate pole position; races in italics indicate fastest lap)

British Superbike Championship

By year

References

External links

1997 births
Living people
English motorcycle racers
Moto3 World Championship riders
People from Jacksdale
Sportspeople from Nottinghamshire
Supersport World Championship riders
People from Amber Valley
Sportspeople from Derbyshire